Alexandre Willaume  (born 20 December 1972) is a Danish actor having had roles in Home Fires (2016),  Valerian and the City of a Thousand Planets and The Last Kingdom  (2017), Tomb Raider (2018),  COBRA and The Head  (2020), The Wheel of Time  (2021), and 1899 (2022).

Early life
Alexandre Willaume-Jantzen was born 20 December 1972.in Hellerup, Copenhagen, Denmark. He studied acting at the Danish National School of Performing Arts (Den Danske Scenekunstskole) in Copenhagen from 1996 to 2000.

Willaume was previously married to Henriette Willaume Fobian for 22 years, however, the couple divorced in 2018. As of 2021, Willaume is in a relationship with Lillie Østergaard, who runs a beauty salon in Copenhagen.

Career
Willaume spent several years at the Royal Danish Theatre, Copenhagen before realising it was not meant to be, and made him seek television and film roles.

In 2016, Willaume was cast in Marek Novotny for six episodes of the Julie Summers  Jambusters based British wartime drama series Home Fires.
 
In 2017,  Willaume starred as Captain Kris  in the Luc Besson directed Valerian and the City of a Thousand Planets, in a cast which included John Goodman, Dane DeHaan, Cara Delevingne, Rihanna, Ethan Hawke, and Rutger Hauer. In the same year, he played a main role of Hans in the film Good Favour which featured at the 2017 Toronto International Film Festival.

In 2018, he starred in the film Tomb Raider working with Alicia Vikander who played Lara Croft.

In 2019, in the Viaplay series, Hidden: Förstfödd (Hidden : Firstborn), Willaume plays Maersk, and is the only Dane amongst a cast of Norwegians and Swedes, he considered this to be his most interesting work to date. In 2020, he starred as the station commander John Berg, in the Antarctic research mystery series  The Head, playing a lead role alongside John Lynch.

In 2021, he starred in the Amazon Prime fantasy series  The Wheel of Time, in a cast which included Rosamund Pike, and appeared in every episode of the Netflix period mystery-science fiction series  1899 in 2022.

Filmography

Film

Television

Awards and nominations

References

External links

Instagram Alexandre Willaume

1972 births
Living people
20th-century Danish male actors
21st-century Danish male actors
Danish male film actors
Danish male television actors
Male actors from Copenhagen
Danish male actors